General elections were held in Vanuatu on 6 July 2004. The VP-VNP coalition won the most seats, but failed to gain a majority, which instead was cobbled together by Serge Vohor of the Union of Moderate Parties, who became Prime Minister, subsequently forming a national unity government.

However, after disagreements over establishing relations with Taiwan, he was removed from office by a motion of no confidence and replaced by the Vanuatu National United Party's Ham Lini.

Nine women candidates took part in the election. Two were elected.

Results

See also
List of members of the Parliament of Vanuatu (2004–2008)

References

Elections in Vanuatu
Vanuatu
General
Vanuatu
Election and referendum articles with incomplete results